or  is a glacier in Narvik Municipality in Nordland county, Norway. It is one of the larger plateau glaciers in Norway. The glacier lies near the Skjomen fjord, a branch of the Ofotfjorden, just southwest of the town of Narvik. The lakes Geitvatnet, Isvatnet, Kjelvatnet, Nordre Bukkevatnet and Søre Bukkevatnet all lie just to the southwest of the glacier.

See also
List of glaciers in Norway

References

Ballangen
Narvik
Glaciers of Nordland